The Batangas City Tanduay Rum Masters is a professional basketball team currently competing in the Maharlika Pilipinas Basketball League (MPBL) and the Filbasket. The team traces its roots to the original Tanduay Rhum Masters that played in the Philippine Basketball Association (PBA) from 1975 to 1987 and again from 1999 to 2001. Batangas City, just as the original Tanduay team, is owned and affiliated with Tanduay Distillers.

As part of the MPBL, the team is based in Batangas and has played its home games at the Batangas City Sports Coliseum, Batangas State University Gym and De La Salle Lipa Sentrum Gym.

History
 On January 27, 2018, Batangas City Athletics won its first game against the Valenzuela Classic in the inaugural season of the Maharlika Pilipinas Basketball League.
 On April 19, the team was crowned as the inaugural MPBL Champions after defeating Muntinlupa Cagers, 68–66, in Game 4 of their best-of-5 finals series.
 The team participated at the 2021 FilBasket Subic Championship as the MTrans Buracai de Laiya Batangas City Tanduay Athletics.
 The team as the Tanduay Rum Masters has committed to participate in the 2022 Filbasket season. This would potentially mark the return of Tanduay Distillers' return to professional sports, if Filbasket turns to a professional league starting the upcoming season. The last involvement of Tanduay in professional basketball was when it organized the Tanduay Rhum Masters in the Philippine Basketball Association.

Current roster

Depth chart

Head coaches

All-time roster

 Val Acuña (2018–2019)
 Lester Alvarez (2018–2019)
 Karl Atilares (2018)
 James Dramayo (2018–present)
 Jhaymo Eguilos (2018–present)
 Peter Garcia (2018–present)
 Jayson Grimaldo (2018–present)
 Marbin Macalalad (2018–present)
 Jon Macasaet (2018)
 Mark Olayon (2018–present)
 Jerry Orera (2018)
 Julius Pasculado (2018)
 Bong Quinto (2018–2019)
 Jhon Ragasa (2018)
 Moncrief Rogado (2018–present)
 Adrian Santos (2018–present)
 Bernabe Teodoro (2018–present)
 Paul Varilla (2018–present)
 Jeff Viernes  (2019–2020)
 Dennice Villamor (2018–2019)

MPBL records

See also
Tanduay Light Rhum Masters

References

 
2018 establishments in the Philippines
Basketball teams established in 2018
Maharlika Pilipinas Basketball League teams